Seminole State College is a public community college in Seminole, Oklahoma.

History 
The college was founded as Seminole Junior College in 1931 and was renamed Seminole State College in 1996.

Campus 
The campus is in Seminole, Oklahoma at the junction of Highway 9 W and U.S. Route 270.

Academics 
The college provides one and two-year programs of collegiate-level technical-occupational education.

Athletics 
The college athletics teams are nicknamed the Trojans.

Notable alumni
Nick Blackburn, professional baseball player
Anthony Bowie, professional basketball player
Éric Gagné, professional baseball player
Ryan Franklin, professional baseball player
Evan Gattis, professional baseball player
Simone Edwards, professional basketball player
Abraham Toro, professional baseball player

References

External links
Official website

 
Buildings and structures in Seminole County, Oklahoma
Education in Seminole County, Oklahoma
Educational institutions established in 1931
Community colleges in Oklahoma
NJCAA athletics
1931 establishments in Oklahoma